The 2017–18 Ranji Trophy was the 84th season of the Ranji Trophy, the first-class cricket tournament in India. It was contested by 28 teams divided into four groups, each containing seven teams. The top two teams from Group D progressed to the quarterfinals of the competition. Vidarbha progressed to the knockout stage of the competition after beating Goa by an innings and 37 runs in round 6 of the tournament. They were joined by Bengal, after they drew against Goa in their final group-stage match.

Teams
The following teams were placed in Group D, based on their average points in the previous three years:

 Bengal
 Chhattisgarh
 Goa
 Himachal Pradesh
 Punjab
 Services
 Vidarbha

Points table

Fixtures

Round 1

Round 2

Round 3

Round 4

Round 5

Round 6

Round 7

References

Ranji Trophy seasons
Ranji Trophy Trophy
Ranji Trophy
Ranji Trophy